Sascha Kegel Konietzko (born 21 June 1961), also known as Sascha K and Käpt'n K, is a German musician and record producer. He is the founder, frontman and "anchor" of the industrial band KMFDM. Konietzko jokingly purports himself to be the father of industrial rock.  Keyboard Magazine wrote of him, "You won't find a more imaginative or effective keyboardist on the hard-core scene."

KMFDM
Konietzko is best known for his role as frontman of KMFDM.  Having founded the group as a performance art project in 1984, he is the only member of KMFDM to appear on every release, and the only founding member still in the band. His main instruments are keyboards and drums, although he is also proficient at playing guitar and bass guitar.

Side projects
Konietzko has formed a number of side-projects:
Excessive Force in 1990 with Buzz McCoy from My Life With The Thrill Kill Kult
MDFMK in 1999 with Lucia Cifarelli and Tim Skold
Schwein in 2000 with members of the Japanese band Buck-Tick and English musician Raymond Watts
KGC in 2006 with Lucia Cifarelli and Dean Garcia of Curve
 OK•ZTEIN•OK in 2011, Konietzko's first solo project

Remixes

He has re-mixed acts including Metallica, Megadeth, White Zombie, Rammstein, Love & Rockets, Kittie, Die Krupps, Flotsam & Jetsam, Living Colour, Mindless Self Indulgence, Combichrist, Young Gods, and Pig.

Personal life
Sascha Konietzko lived in the United States from 1991 to 2007, dividing his time among Chicago, New York City, and Seattle before moving back to his hometown of Hamburg, Germany.  Konietzko and Lucia Cifarelli married in 2005.

References

1961 births
Living people
Musicians from New York City
Musicians from Chicago
Musicians from Hamburg
Musicians from Seattle
German industrial musicians
KMFDM members
Missing Foundation members
Schwein members
Excessive Force members